Werner Mountains is a group of mountains located just west-southwest of New Bedford Inlet and between the Meinardus and Bryan Glaciers, in Palmer Land. The mountains were first seen and photographed from the air by the United States Antarctic Service (USAS), 1939–41. Mapped by United States Geological Survey (USGS) from surveys and U.S. Navy air photos, 1961–67. Named by Advisory Committee on Antarctic Names (US-ACAN) for Abraham Gottlob Werner (1750–1819), German geologist and mineralogist.

Features

 Bryan Glacier
 Douglas Glacier
 Mount Broome
 Mount Fell
 Mount Hemmingsen
 Mount Virdin

Mountain ranges of Palmer Land